Walter Leodán Chalá Vázquez (born 24 February 1992) is an Ecuadorian football forward who plays for Universidad Católica of the Ecuadorian Serie A.

Club career
He made his debut in the Russian National Football League for FC Neftekhimik Nizhnekamsk on 29 April 2013 in a game against FC Petrotrest Saint Petersburg.

International career
He was named in Ecuador's senior squad for a 2018 FIFA World Cup qualifier against Brazil in September 2016. He made his debut on 29 March 2021 in a friendly against Bolivia.

References

External links

1992 births
Living people
Ecuadorian footballers
Ecuador international footballers
C.D. Cuenca footballers
FC Rubin Kazan players
C.S.D. Independiente del Valle footballers
Ecuadorian expatriate footballers
Expatriate footballers in Russia
Ecuadorian expatriate sportspeople in Russia
Association football forwards
Barcelona S.C. footballers
Correcaminos UAT footballers
C.D. Universidad Católica del Ecuador footballers
L.D.U. Quito footballers
Ascenso MX players
Expatriate footballers in Mexico
People from Carchi Province
FC Neftekhimik Nizhnekamsk players